Malaysia competed at the 2012 Summer Paralympics in London, United Kingdom from August 29 to September 9, 2012.

Medalists 
The country won two medals, a silver and a bronze.

Archery

Men

|- 
|align=left|Mohd Zafi Rahman Mat Saleh
|align=left rowspan=3|Individual Recurve W1/W2
|481
|24
| L 0-6
|colspan=5|did not advance
|-
|align=left|Zulkifli Mat Zin
|572
|16
| L 4-6
|colspan=5|did not advance
|-
|align=left|Hasihin Sanawi
|559
|19
| W 6-2
| W 6-5
| W 6-4
| W 6-5
| L 5-6
|
|-
|align=left|Mohd Zafi Rahman Mat SalehZulkifli Mat ZinHasihin Sanawi
|align=left|Team Recurve
|1612
|10
|
| L 190-197
|colspan=4|did not advance
|}

Athletics

Men’s Field Events

Women’s Track and Road Events

Women’s Field Events

Cycling

Road

Men

Powerlifting

Men

Women

Sailing

Swimming

Men

Qualifiers for the latter rounds (Q) of all events were decided on a time only basis, therefore positions shown are overall results versus competitors in all heats.

Table tennis

Men

Wheelchair Fencing

Men

See also

 Malaysia at the 2012 Summer Olympics

References

Nations at the 2012 Summer Paralympics
2012
2012 in Malaysian sport